Saint Justinian is the name of:

Byzantine emperor Justinian I (483–565), saint in the Eastern Orthodox tradition
Saint Justinian of Ramsey Island (also Stinan, Jestin or Iestin, died 6th-century), hermit who lived on Ramsey Island, near St. David's, Pembrokeshire, Wales
Saint Lawrence Justinian (1381–1456), Bishop and first Patriarch of Venice
St Justinian, coastal location in Pembrokeshire, Wales